Justice Gonzalez may refer to:

Alberto Gonzales, associate justice of the Texas Supreme Court
Raul A. Gonzalez, associate justice of the Texas Supreme Court
Steven González, associate justice of the Washington Supreme Court

See also
José Fernando Franco González-Salas, justice of the Mexican National Supreme Court of Justice
Raul M. Gonzalez, Secretary of Justice of the Philippines